John Crombie may refer to:
 John Crombie (Royal Navy officer) (1900–1972), Scottish Royal Navy admiral
 John Crombie (minister) (1789–1872), minister of the Church of Scotland
 John William Crombie (1858–1908), Scottish woollen manufacturer, folklorist and politician
 John Nicol Crombie (1827–1878), New Zealand photographer and businessman

See also
 Jonathan Crombie (1966–2015), Canadian actor